efax may refer to:

Internet fax, the transferral of fax information using the Internet
efax (software), a computer based fax program for Unix-like computer systems
Everett Efax file format, a file format